Wilhelm Hasemann (16 September 1850, Mühlberg - 28 November 1913, Gutach) was a German genre painter and illustrator.

Life and career 
Hasemann was the only son of a mechanic and left school at the age of fifteen to work in his father's shop. After displaying some artistic talent, he went to study at the Prussian Academy of Arts, the Weimar Saxon-Grand Ducal Art School and the Academy of Fine Arts, Karlsruhe where he was a student of Gustav Schönleber. In 1880, he visited the village of Gutach for the first time as part of an assignment to illustrate the novella "Lorle, die Frau Professorin" by Berthold Auerbach. Later, he and his brother-in-law Curt Liebich would establish an artists' colony at Gutach. In 1898, he was named a Professor by Frederick I, Grand Duke of Baden.

Hasemenn's paintings focused on rural life, customs and traditional dress, and his works were widely reproduced as postcards and magazine illustrations. He often collaborated with the writer Heinrich Hansjakob, who lived nearby in Haslach. They shared an interest in preserving the culture of the Black Forest region.

The primary and secondary schools in Gutach are named after him, as well as the art museum and the game preserve between Hausach and Schonach. In addition, the mountain hut on the Farrenkopf on the Westweg between Hausach and Schonach bears his name.

References

Further reading 
 Ludwig Vögely: Der Schwarzwaldmaler Wilhelm Hasemann (1850–1913). In: Badische Heimat 69 (1989) pgs.13–25 (full text online) 
 Georg A. Kuhlins: Wilhelm Hasemann. Ein Maler aus dem Kreis Liebenwerda. In: Schwarze Elster Nr. 29 (606) Kreismuseum Bad Liebenwerda 1988
 Hermann Busse: Der Schwarzwaldmaler Wilhelm Hasemann, Bühl-Konkordia, Leipzig, 1921.

External links 

 
 Kunstmuseum Hasemann-Liebich in Gutach
 Works by and photographs of Wilhelm Hasemann @ Landeskunde Online

1850 births
1913 deaths
People from Elbe-Elster
Genre painters
Prussian Academy of Arts alumni
19th-century German painters
19th-century German male artists
German male painters
20th-century German painters
20th-century German male artists
Black Forest